Leung Sing Poh MBE (1908 – 12 February 1981) was an actor, host and former Cantonese opera performer from Hong Kong. Leung was a pioneer actor of TVB, and was also the former chairman of Chinese Artist Association of Hong Kong from 1965 to 1970. He was nicknamed "Por Suk" or "Uncle Por", and was credited with over 440 films. He had a star at Avenue of Stars in Hong Kong.

Early life
Leung was born as Leung Guang Choy in Singapore in 1908. Leung was devoted to Cantonese Opera ever since he was young. Leung loved the legendary Ma Sze Tsang and learnt the Ma style of singing Cantonese opera. His father Leong Yuet was a famous Cantonese opera performer in Singapore. Leong convinced his father to allow him to learn Cantonese opera from a Malaysian master, known as Dai Dam Kan (Big Brave Kan in Cantonese). Leung officially joined a Cantonese opera troupe at the age of 18. Leung started acting in Wusheng roles which made him very popular and one of the members of the Nanyang four kings of Cantonese opera.

Career
Leung was discovered by Ma Sze Tsang.
In 1939, Ma Sze Tsang's Taiping troupe in Hong Kong needed actors, he invited Leung to join the Taiping troupe. In 1940, Leung became a Cantonese opera performer in Hong Kong. During the World War II,  when the Japanese attacked Hong Kong, Leung brought his family to escape to Guangzhou to Macau  then to Guangxi At Guangxi, he formed a Cantonese opera troupe there and performed in various towns of Guangxi. After the world war, Leung started to gain weight, and was unsuitable for acting Wusheng anymore, and thus changed to Chousheng (clown) in which he portrayed villainous and also funny roles in cantonese opera, acting in several famous Cantonese Opera troupes, Leung thus gained the reputation of  being "Chousheng Wang" or Clown King in Cantonese opera.

In 1941, Leung crossed over as an actor in Hong Kong films. Leung first appeared in Chaos in the Universe, a 1941 comedy film directed by Cheung Oi-Man. Leung was known for his role as Silly Wong in Silly Wong Growing Rich, 1960 comedy film directed by Chu Kei. Leung's last film was The Hong Kong Tycoon, a 1979 Drama film directed by Cecille Tong. Leung is credited with over 440 films.

Leung is one of the pioneer actors of TVB. Leung hosted the popular Enjoy Yourself Tonight show in Hong Kong for many years till his death.

Chinese Artist Association of Hong Kong
From 1965 to 1970, Leung was the chairman of  Chinese Artist Association of Hong Kong, an association of Hong Kong Cantonese opera artists. Leung contributed greatly to the Hong Kong Cantonese opera industry.

Filmography

Films 
This is a partial list of films.
 1950 Lust of a Grand Lady - Lau Kai 
 1961 The Greatest Civil War on Earth
1962 The Greatest Wedding on Earth (南北一家亲)
 1974 Naughty! Naughty! (綽頭狀元)
 1976 Princess Chang Ping (aka Dai Nui Fa) - Chou Chung / Chow Chung.

Television 
 1967 Enjoy Yourself Tonight

Awards 
 1977 MBE for his artistic contributions towards Cantonese Opera. Presented by Governor Murray MacLehose. 13 April 1977.
 Star. Avenue of Stars. Tsim Sha Tsui waterfront in Hong Kong.

Personal life 
Leung's wife was Koo Man-kuen. They have seven children, four girls and three boys.

Three of Leung's daughters became actresses. Leung Po-Ching is an actress known for portraying a housewife in EYT, Margaret Leung Po-man (Man Lan) -  actress with movie opposite Bruce Lee, and Leung Po-Chu - another Cantonese opera performer.

On 14 February 1981, Leung died of intestinal cancer. He was aged 73.

References

External links
 
 Leung Sing-Bor at hkcinemagic.com
 Leung Sing-Bo at dianyang.com
 Leung Sing Bo at senscritique.com

Members of the Order of the British Empire
Hong Kong male Cantonese opera actors
1908 births
1981 deaths
TVB actors
20th-century Hong Kong male singers
20th-century Singaporean male singers
20th-century Hong Kong male actors
20th-century Singaporean male actors
Singaporean male film actors
Singaporean male television actors
Singaporean emigrants to Hong Kong
Hong Kong male television actors
Singaporean male musical theatre actors
Singaporean born Hong Kong artists